Elaheh (born Bahar Gholamhosseini 1934 – 15 August 2007) was an Iranian singer. Iranian musicians she worked with include Parviz Yahaghi, Viguen and Homayun Khorram. She was one of the main singers of "Golha" program.

Career
She studied singing with Abdollah Davami, an Iranian Radif maestro and Gholam-Hosein Banan, an Iranian classical singer. At 27, she was recognized by Davoud Pirnia, the founder of Golha radio program.
She has more than 100 recordings in that program.

Among her performances were "Rosvaa-ye Zamaaneh" and "Az Khoon-e Javavane Vatan".

References

20th-century Iranian women singers
2007 deaths
1934 births
Women singers on Golha